David M. Evans is Professor of Statistical Genetics and Head of Genomic Medicine at the Diamantina Institute at the University of Queensland. He received his Ph.D. from the University of Queensland in 2003, after which he completed a four-year postdoc at the University of Oxford's Wellcome Trust Centre for Human Genetics. During his postdoc, he conducted research for the International HapMap Project and the Wellcome Trust Case Control Consortium. In 2007, he became a senior lecturer at the University of Bristol, where he conducted research on genome-wide association studies based on the Avon Longitudinal Study of Parents and Children. He became a professor at the University of Queensland in 2013. He is known for researching the genetics of complex traits in humans, such as osteoporosis, asthma, and binge eating. He was an ISI Highly Cited Researcher in 2015 and 2016.

References

External links
Faculty profile

Living people
Australian geneticists
Academic staff of the University of Queensland
Statistical geneticists
Human geneticists
University of Queensland alumni
Academics of the University of Bristol
Year of birth missing (living people)